Thomas Lundin is a Swedish football manager. He was Djurgårdens IF manager in 1992.

References

Swedish football managers
Djurgårdens IF Fotboll managers
Living people
Year of birth missing (living people)